Robason is an English language surname, a derivative of the name "Robinson" or "Robertson".

See also
 Roberson (disambiguation)
 Robertson (disambiguation)
 Robinson (disambiguation)
 Robeson (disambiguation)

References 

Surnames of British Isles origin